Anthony David Wall (born 29 May 1975) is an English professional golfer.

Career
Wall was born in London. He turned professional in 1995 and has played on the European Tour since 1998. He has made the top 100 on the Order of Merit every season since his rookie year. His only European Tour win to date came at the 2000 Alfred Dunhill Championship in South Africa. In 2006 he was the leading British player at The Open Championship, finishing in a tie for eleventh place. Also in 2006 achieved his best year-end ranking on the Order of Merit of 13th. In 2011, Wall was in contention to win his first tour level event in 11 years at the Sicilian Open but hit his approach shot on 17 into the water resulting in a double bogey and missing out by one stroke.

In 2016, Wall won the Paul Lawrie Match Play, his first victory in over 16 years and second on the European Tour, a Tour record for time between wins.

In May 2018, Wall announced his retirement from professional golf. He is currently one of the rotating on-course commentators for the European Tour world-feed broadcast.

Amateur wins
1993 Golf Illustrated Gold Vase

Professional wins (2)

European Tour wins (2)

*Note: The 2000 Alfred Dunhill Championship was shortened to 54 holes due to rain.
1Co-sanctioned by the Sunshine Tour

Results in major championships

Note: Wall never played in the Masters Tournament.

CUT = missed the half-way cut
"T" indicates a tie for a place

Results in World Golf Championships

"T" = Tied

Team appearances
Amateur
Jacques Léglise Trophy (representing Great Britain & Ireland): 1993 (winners)

Professional
Royal Trophy (representing Europe): 2007 (winners)
Seve Trophy (representing Great Britain & Ireland): 2009 (winners)

References

External links

English male golfers
European Tour golfers
Golfers from London
People from Sunninghill
1975 births
Living people